The lesser fat-tailed jerboa (Pygeretmus platyurus) is a species of rodent in the family Dipodidae. It is endemic to West, Central, and Eastern Kazakhstan, as well as Northwestern Turkmenistan.

References

Wilson, D. E. and Reader, D. M. Mammal Species of the World: A Taxonomic and Geographic Reference. DHU Press. 2005.

Mammals of Central Asia
Endemic fauna of Central Asia
Pygeretmus
Mammals described in 1823
Taxonomy articles created by Polbot